Anastasiya Dzedzikava (born 2 January 1997) is a Belarusian professional racing cyclist. She signed to ride for the UCI Women's Team  for the 2019 women's road cycling season, but left midway through the season.

References

External links

1997 births
Living people
Belarusian female cyclists
Place of birth missing (living people)